The Rødsand mine is one of the largest titanium mines in Norway. The mine is located in Møre og Romsdal. The mine has reserves amounting to 131 million tonnes of ore grading 4% titanium.

References 

Titanium mines in Norway
Møre og Romsdal